Ralph John Nicholls, FRCS (Eng), EBSQ is a retired British colorectal surgeon, Emeritus Consultant Surgeon at St Mark’s Hospital London and Professor of Colorectal Surgery, Imperial College London.

R. John Nicholls is best known for his work in the development of ileal pouch surgery. With the advancement of ileal-anal pouch surgery, selected patients with ulcerative colitis (UC) and familial adenomatous polyposis (FAP) were successfully relieved of the disease through removing the colon and rectum, but in contrast to the conventional operation of a total proctocolectomy used at the time, ileal pouch-anal anastomosis (IPAA) surgery also called Reconstructive Procotocolectomy (RPC) added the optional choice for the person to avoid the need for a stoma and external appliance bag by internally holding stool in a pouch made from ileum (small bowel) that connects to the anus and restores traditional anal evacuation.

The drive behind creating and developing ileo-anal pouch surgery was to improve the quality of life for select patients who were medically suitable to undergo the procedure.  The pouch operation with anal anastomosis was designed to be the patient's choice between life with an ileostomy or they could choose an elective/optional pouch reconstruction after the colon and rectum needed to be removed due to disease.  Unlike the Kock pouch procedure by Finnish surgeon Dr Nils Koch first reported in Sweden in 1969 which is a continent ileostomy, the ileo-anal pouch was an advancement in pouch surgery because it allowed for the ileum pouch to be emptied by traditional anal evacuation.

Career

Training and early appointments 
Nicholls studied medicine at the University of Cambridge.

He completed his clinical training and surgical residency at the London Hospital (known from 1990 as the Royal London Hospital) and became a Fellow of the Royal College of Surgeons in England in 1972. It was at the London Hospital, that Nicholls trained under British surgeon Sir Alan Parks.

Parks operated on his first ileo-anal pouch patient in 1976 at the London Hospital and subsequently at St Mark’s Hospital where he was also a consultant.  Having spent 1976 carrying out research under Professor Fritz Linder on an Alexander von Humboldt Fellowship in the Department of Surgery at the Heidelberg University in Germany, Nicholls became an assistant at St Mark's on his return to the UK in 1977 and subsequently a consultant in 1978.  He participated in early pouch surgeries after the first surgery, from 1976.

Beginning of ileum pouch surgery 
The ileal pouch-anal anastomosis (IPAA) procedure was an advancement from the ileoanal anastomosis procedure premiered in the 1940s.  With an ileum-anal anastomosis, total removal of the large bowel (colon and rectum) with a surgical join (anastomosis) between the small intestine (ileum) above and the anus below was described by the German surgeon Nissen in 1934 and by the Americans Ravich and Sabiston in 1947.  This procedure was uncomfortable for many, because it led to a high number of bowel movements throughout the day.

In 1969, Finnish surgeon Dr Nils Koch premiered his continent ileostomy procedure in Sweden.  The procedure known as a Kock pouch used the terminal ileum to store liquid stool inside the body that could later be removed via a stoma at the person's convenience.  It eliminated the need for an external appliance bag since the pouch created from ileum was inside the body holding waste until removal.

Beginning of ileal pouch-anal anastomosis (IPAA) surgery 
Alan Parks added the construction of a reservoir or ‘pouch’ made from 40-50 centimetres of the small bowel (ileum) immediately above the excised colon and rectum before performing the anastomosis between the ileal pouch and the anus. This not only restored anal evaculation but was intended to improve the patient's function by reducing the frequency of defaecation as much as was possible. The operation is known by several names globally today including ileal pouch, Parks' pouch, pelvic pouch, S-pouch, J-pouch, W-pouch, Ileal Pouch Anal Anastomosis (IPAA) and restorative proctocolectomy (RPC).

Together Parks and Nicholls authored the seminal article on ileo-anal pouch surgery entitled “Proctocolectomy without ileostomy for ulcerative colitis” in 1978 published by the British Medical Journal.

Initial published studies on the reconstructive pouch-anal anastomosis procedure were mainly centred on clinical results including complications and function, but the form of the reservoir soon became an area of development. Parks's premiered pouch surgery using a S-shaped pouch.  Parks’ ‘S-pouch’ design was often followed by difficulty in evacuation of stool due to a 2 cm piece of ileum below the pouch attaching the pouch to the anal canal, which the J-pouch described by Utsunomiya in 1980 largely avoided.

The demonstration of an inverse relationship between the capacity of the pouch and the frequency of defaecation led to further designs including the W-pouch described by Nicholls in 1987 which was free from difficulty in defaecation and appeared to also be followed by fewer bowel actions per 24 hours than the J-pouch.  Professor Nicholls performed his first W-pouch surgeries around 1982.

Professorship and accolades 
Following the unexpected death of Alan Parks on November 3, 1982, John Nicholls became the most active pouch surgeon in the United Kingdom. At this time he was still a mid-career surgeon but he had been working with the operation since its inception when he was still a senior registrar (chief resident).

By the early 1980s, the ileal pouch procedure had become part of specialist colorectal surgical practices worldwide. In the United States the Australian-born surgeon Victor Warren Fazio at the Cleveland Clinic and Roger Dozois at the Mayo Clinic began publishing on the operation in the early 1980s greatly increasing its diffusion and there was generous co-operation among these units, St Mark's and colorectal departments in Canada (Zane Cohen), France (Professor Rolland Parc) and Italy (Dr Gilberto Poggioli).

Other contributions to coloproctology include aspects of rectal cancer related to staging and his collaboration with Michael Kamm in the field of incontinence.  He was a founding member of the European Society of Coloproctology and instigated Accreditation and Certification for colorectal surgery in the Union Européenne des Médecins Specialistes (UEMS).

Professor Nicholls became Dean of St Mark's Academic Institute in 1993 and held the position until 1997.  From 1997 to 2001, Professor Nicholls was the Clinical Director of St Mark's Hospital.  During this time (from 1997-2002), Professor Nicholls was additionally a Specialist Advisory Committee Member in General Surgery for Higher Surgical Training in the United Kingdom.

With his senior colleague James Thomson he formed the St Mark’s Academic honorary membership.  Fellowships have been awarded to him by many professional bodies including the Royal College of Physicians of London, the American College of Surgeons, the American Society of Colon and Rectal Surgeons, the surgical Royal Colleges of Edinburgh, Ireland and Glasgow, l’Academie Nationale de Chirurgie, the British Society of Gastroenterology (BSG) and the national colorectal societies in Italy, France, Spain, Austria, Switzerland, Yugoslavia, Chile, Argentina, Canada, Australia and Poland.

Before his retirement from National Health Service (NHS) practice, Professor John Nicholls was the President of the European Association of Coloproctology in 2004.  The organisation is now called the European Society of Coloproctology.  Professor Nicholls retired from NHS practice in 2006 but kept active in the field of colorectal surgery until his full retirement in 2014.  He has authored over 300 publications and four books.

Professor Nicholls remains a Patron of the Red Lion Group (RLG), a national support group and charity for people with pouches founded by a group of St Mark's staff and patients in 1994.  Professor Nicholls' had an instrumental role in the launch of the Red Lion's Group helping to house it at St Mark's Hospital.  He previously served as the first President of the Red Lion Group from 1994 until Professor Nicholls' retirement from the NHS in 2006.

See also 
 Colorectal Surgery
 Alan Guyatt Parks
 Victor Warren Fazio
 Peter V. Delaney
 Conor P. Delaney

References

British colorectal surgeons
British consultants
British gastroenterologists
Royal College of Surgeons of England
Digestive system surgery
Living people
Alumni of Gonville and Caius College, Cambridge
Year of birth missing (living people)